Vilhjálmur Vilhjálmsson may refer to:

 Vilhjálmur Þórmundur Vilhjálmsson (born 1946), Icelandic lawyer and politician
 Vilhjálmur Vilhjálmsson (singer) (1945–1978), Icelandic musician and singer